Jina (Zina) is an Afroasiatic language of Cameroon. The Muxule variety may be a distinct language.

Jina is spoken in Zina commune, located just to the south of Logone-Birni commune. Muxule is spoken in a few villages to the north of Logone-Birni (department of Logone-et-Chari, Far North Region) by 1,500 speakers. The people of Zina claim to understand Lagwan and Munjuk better than Muxule.

References

Biu-Mandara languages
Languages of Cameroon